List of blacks may refer to:
Lists of black people
Shades of black